Ludovico I may refer to:

 Ludovico I Gonzaga (1268–1360), better known as Luigi, the first Capitano del Popolo ('Captain of the People') of Mantua and Imperial Vicar
 Ludovico I of Saluzzo  (died in 1475)